Buzz!: Brain of... is the eighth title in the Buzz! series of quiz video games. The game has 21 regional variations with the game's title being changed depending upon region, but the basic concept behind the game remains the same.

The questions in Buzz!: Brain of the UK are specifically about UK general knowledge. Wildlife, TV, Sport.
The versions of the game for other countries follow the same pattern except for being slanted towards general knowledge with a connection to that specific country.

The PlayStation 3 version of the game will feature online play and will also allow access to user created questions on the My Buzz! site as well as leaderboards that rank online play.

Brain of the UK was available for the PlayStation 3, PlayStation 2 and PlayStation Portable, the first time that a single title in the Buzz! series has been available on multiple platforms.

The PlayStation Portable version features a single player game and, like the previous Buzz! PSP game Buzz!: Master Quiz, Brain of the UK has a "pass-around" mode to enable up to 6 players to take part in the same quiz.

The PlayStation 2 version of the game will follow the same format as previous Buzz! games for the platform. Essentially being the same as the PlayStation 3 version but with lower resolution graphics and no online features.

Versions

References

External links 
Relentless Software

Buzz!
2009 video games
PlayStation 3 games
PlayStation 2 games
PlayStation Portable games
EyeToy games
Sony Interactive Entertainment games
Video games developed in the United Kingdom
Europe-exclusive video games
Relentless Software games
Multiplayer and single-player video games